Aron Ain is an American software technology executive and author. He became the CEO of UKG (Ultimate Kronos Group) in 2020, a role he held until being named UKG Executive Chair, effective July 1, 2022. UKG was created from the merger of Ultimate Software and Kronos Incorporated, and provides global HCM and workforce management solutions. Previously, Ain had been the chief executive officer of Kronos Incorporated since 2005.

Career 
Ain joined Kronos in 1979 and has played a role in nearly every functional department at the organization. In October 2005, he was named chief executive officer and a member of the Kronos Board of Directors.

In 2007, Ain led the effort to take the company private, after going public in 1992.

Under his leadership, the company completed a major, multi-year business transformation, changing from a licensed-software model to a cloud, software-as-a-service (SaaS) model.

In 2016, Ain introduced new benefits to employees such as open vacation time and student loan repayment. A new manager performance rating was also created, called the Manager Effectiveness Index (MEI), which captures employee judgments about managers' performance.

In 2017, Kronos relocated its headquarters to the Crosspoint Towers in Lowell, Massachusetts.

In 2020, Kronos completed a merger with Ultimate Software to create UKG, and Ain became the chairman and chief executive officer of the combined company. UKG has more than 12,000 employees worldwide, and an enterprise value of $22 billion.

On June 1, 2022, UKG announced Ain would transition to UKG Executive Chair, effective July 1, 2022. Chris Todd, current President at UKG, will replace Ain as CEO.

Affiliations 
Ain serves on the board of trustees of his alma mater, Hamilton College. He is on the board of trustees of Boston's Beth Israel Deaconess Medical Center. He is on the board of directors of Combined Jewish Philanthropies of Greater Boston (CJP).

Honors 
On multiple occasions, Glassdoor has named Ain to its list of Top 100 CEOs in the U.S. In 2019, he ranked 30th out of the 100 highest-rated CEOs throughout North America and parts of Europe across all industries.

In addition, he has been awarded the Ernst & Young's Entrepreneur of the Year award, the Massachusetts High Technology Council's Ray Stata Leadership and Innovation Award, and the Massachusetts Technology Leadership Council's CEO of the Year Award.

References 

Year of birth missing (living people)
Living people
American technology chief executives
Hamilton College (New York) alumni
21st-century American male writers
21st-century American businesspeople
American business writers
21st-century American non-fiction writers
20th-century American businesspeople